HD 41534 is a binary star system in the southern constellation of Columba. It is dimply visible to the naked eye with a combined apparent visual magnitude of 5.65. The distance to this system is approximately 950 light-years based on parallax, and it is receding from the Sun with a radial velocity of +93 km/s. It is thought to have been ejected from the OB association Sco OB 1 approximately 14 million years ago.

The primary component is a B-type main-sequence star with a stellar classification of B2V. It displays microvariability with an amplitude of 0.0086 in magnitude and a frequency of 0.11316 cycles per day. The star is an estimated 14 million years old with a high rate of spin, showing a projected rotational velocity of 122. It has seven times the mass of the Sun and about four times the Sun's radius. HD 41534 is radiating over 1,600 times the luminosity of the Sun from its photosphere at an effective temperature of 20,000 K.

References

B-type main-sequence stars
Binary stars
Runaway stars

Columba (constellation)
CD-32 02743
041534
028756
2149